Mirage is the fourth studio album by Dutch DJ and record producer Armin van Buuren. It was released on 10 September 2010 by Armada Music, and was preceded by the release of the lead single, "Full Focus" on 24 June 2010. The album features collaborations with English singer Sophie Ellis-Bextor, British singer Christian Burns, Pakistani-American singer Nadia Ali, American music producer BT, Dutch music producer Ferry Corsten, and Adam Young of Owl City.

The album debuted at number 3 in the Netherlands, and at number 113 in the United Kingdom. It debuted at number 148 in the United States on the Billboard 200, while also charting at the Dance/Electronic Albums chart at number 5.

Track listing 

Notes
The deluxe edition includes a DVD with music videos.
 signifies a vocal producer

Charts

Weekly charts

Year-end charts

Certifications

References

External links 
 Album Info on ArmadaMusic.com

2010 albums
Armin van Buuren albums
Armada Music albums